The 2021 Grampians Trophy was a tournament on the 2021 WTA Tour. It was played on outdoor hardcourts in Melbourne, Australia. It was organised as a lead-up tournament to the 2021 Australian Open, and was held at the same venue, due to other tournaments in Australia being cancelled due to the COVID-19 pandemic. This tournament was created for players who had originally intended to participate in the 2021 Yarra Valley Classic or the 2021 Gippsland Trophy, but were forced to undergo strict quarantine measures upon arrival in Australia due to confirmed COVID-19 cases found on several of the chartered player flights to Australia. There was no doubles event.

Due to a delayed schedule because of a COVID-19 case at a tournament quarantine hotel and the semifinals taking place just one day before the start of the Australian Open, the final was not played.

Champions

Singles

  Anett Kontaveit vs.  Ann Li
 Final not held due to delay in schedule. Both finalists received the points and prize money reserved for the finalists: 305 points and  $33,520.

Points and prize money

Point distribution

Prize money

*per team

Singles main-draw entrants

Seeds

1 Rankings are as of 25 January 2021

Other entrants
The following players received entry as an alternate:
  Oksana Kalashnikova
  Ellen Perez

Withdrawals
before the tournament
  Bianca Andreescu → replaced by  Oksana Kalashnikova
  Paula Badosa → replaced by  Bethanie Mattek-Sands
  Alison Riske → replaced by  Ellen Perez
  Dayana Yastremska → replaced by  Gabriela Dabrowski
during the tournament
  Victoria Azarenka

References

External links

2021 WTA Tour
2021 in Australian tennis
Tennis tournaments in Australia
Tennis in Victoria (Australia)
February 2021 sports events in Australia